"Whatever It Takes" is a song by American pop rock band Imagine Dragons. The song was released on May 9, 2017, as a promotional single through Kidinakorner and Interscope. It later became the third single from the band's third studio album, Evolve, on October 6, 2017. It was also the official theme song for WWE's PPV event Battleground, in addition to its inclusion in the video game Madden NFL 18. The song was sent to US contemporary hit radio on February 13, 2018.

Background
The song was announced alongside the name and album art of Evolve via Twitter on May 9, 2017.

Music video
A music video for the song was released on October 12, 2017. It was directed by Matt Eastin and Aaron Hymes. Eastin had also previously directed the music videos for Imagine Dragons' songs "On Top of the World", "Roots", and "Believer". The video begins with lead singer Dan Reynolds swimming through a room filled with water. You can see matchbooks reading "The Overlook Hotel" and "Mt. Qualo, Colorado, references to 'The Shining'. It then cuts to a scene in which Reynolds and the band are playing in the same room; however, it is not filled with water in this scene. As they perform the chorus of the song, the roof crumbles and rain starts pouring in. Throughout the video, the rain persists and the room eventually fills completely with water. However, the band still plays. As Reynolds sings, objects such as boxing gloves and keys float by him along with two people who are seemingly sirens, tugging at him from both sides. Before the final chorus, the music stops and the band floats lifelessly on the water. When they break into song again, the stage has completely changed as the room is no longer underwater, but on fire as the band plays on it. As the video ends, everything is on fire and the music stops. The video won the MTV Video Music Award for Best Rock Video award.

Live performances
In October 2017, Imagine Dragons performed the song on Late Night with Seth Meyers.

On May 30, 2018, they performed the song live before game two of the 2018 Stanley Cup Finals at T-Mobile Arena in their hometown of Las Vegas.

Usage in media
In February 2018, Imagine Dragons asked Conservative Political Action Conference to stop using "Whatever It Takes" on their conference website.

The National Basketball Association (NBA)'s Utah Jazz frequently play the song prior to tip-off of every home game at Vivint Smart Home Arena in Salt Lake City, Utah.

Critical reception
The Guardian writes that "Whatever It Takes" was "written with a sports highlights package in mind ("I love the adrenaline in my veins", wails frontman Dan Reynolds, before chart pop's current obligatory chorus of "woah-ohs" enters)."

Commercial performance
As of May 15, 2018, the song has peaked at number 12 on the Billboard Hot 100.

Track listing

Charts

Weekly charts

Year-end charts

Decade-end charts

Certifications

Release history

Notes

References

2017 singles
2017 songs
Imagine Dragons songs
Songs written by Joel Little
Songs written by Daniel Platzman
Songs written by Ben McKee
Songs written by Wayne Sermon
Songs written by Dan Reynolds (musician)
Number-one singles in Russia
Kidinakorner singles
Interscope Records singles
Utah Jazz
Vegas Golden Knights
American contemporary R&B songs